The majority bonus system (MBS) is a form of semi-proportional representation used in some European countries. Its feature is a majority bonus which gives extra seats or representation in an elected body to the party or to the joined parties with the most votes with the aim of providing government stability.

It is currently used in Greece,San Marino and Armenia, and formerly in Italy from 2006 to 2013.  In Argentina, it is used in the Chamber of Deputies of the Province of Santa Fe, Chubut, and Entre Ríos.

History
Benito Mussolini was the first politician to enact a law to give automatic seats to the winning party and ensured his victory in the 1924 Italian general election. A modified version of the system was reintroduced for the 1953 Italian general election, in which any parliamentary coalition winning an absolute majority of votes would be awarded two-thirds of the seats in Parliament. The Christian Democracy-led coalition fell narrowly short of this majority in the election, and the system was abolished before the 1958 election. The majority bonus system was used in Italian local elections in the 1950s and was reintroduced for local elections in 1993 and national ones in 2006 to replace the scorporo mixed system. In the 2013 Italian general election, the Democratic Party won 292 seats in the House using its 8,644,523 votes and so needed 29,604 preferences to obtain a seat. Its major opponent, The People of Freedom, won 97 seats with 7,332,972 votes and so needed 75,597 votes for a single seat. Effectively, the system in use in Italy from 2006 until 2013, which assigned the jackpot regardless of the percentage of vote achieved by the largest party, was judged as unconstitutional by the Italian Constitutional Court. After a proposed modification involving a run-off vote (between the top two alliances) was also struck down by the court, parallel voting was adopted for the 2018 Italian general election.

Mechanism
It can be based on any form of mechanism used in party-list proportional representation, but a D'Hondt method is most likely, as it will rank seats in an exact order of vote share.

Basically, there are two different forms of majority bonus systems, with clearly different political results:
 The bonus system adds a certain fixed number of additional seats to the winning party or alliance. In the Greek Parliament, where it is sometimes called reinforced proportionality, a sixth of the assembly seats are reserved as extra seats for the winning party. In the Sicilian Regional Assembly, a tenth of the assembly seats are granted to the winning coalition on top of those allocated proportionally.
 The jackpot system ensures the winning party or alliance ends up with at least a certain fixed number of seats in total, by granting it however many additional seats are needed. In the Sanmarinese Parliament, the majority alliance obtains at least the 35 of the total 60 seats. If the winner(s) did only reach 31 seats after a second round, the 4 bonus seats for the winners are deducted from the weakest minority seats ranked using the D'Hondt method. The jackpot system assures a fixed (minimum) number of seats to the winner, while the bonus system adds a fixed number of seats.

Use 
The majority bonus system was adopted by other European countries, especially Greece in 2004 and San Marino at the national level, and France for its regional and municipal elections.

References

Semi-proportional electoral systems
Electoral systems
Fascism
Mixed electoral systems